Fluvidona dorrigoensis is a species of minute freshwater snail with an operculum, an aquatic gastropod mollusc or micromollusc in the family Hydrobiidae.

Distribution
This species is endemic to Australia. It is currently known from specimens collected from Moonmerri Creek near Dorrigo, northern New South Wales.

See also 
 List of non-marine molluscs of Australia

References

External links

Fluvidona
Gastropods of Australia
Endemic fauna of Australia
Gastropods described in 1999